Carl Diener (11 December 1862 in Vienna – 6 January 1928, Vienna) was an Austrian geographer, geologist and paleontologist.

Biography 
In 1883 he received his doctorate from the University of Vienna, where his instructors included Eduard Suess and Melchior Neumayr. In 1893 he changed his venia legendi from geography to geology, a subject that he became an associate professor of in 1897. In 1906 he was named a full professor of paleontology at the University of Vienna.

He is best remembered for his geological (including stratigraphic) and faunistic investigations of the Alps. He also conducted important research on his numerous travels worldwide — Syria and Lebanon (1885), the Pyrenees (1886), the Himalayas (1892), Svalbard (1893), the Urals and the Caucasus (1897), North America (1901), et al. In 1895, with Wilhelm Heinrich Waagen, he proposed the Anisian Stage (a division of the Middle Triassic) as a replacement for the "Alpine Muschelkalk".

He was an avid mountaineer, and for a number of years was president of the Österreichischer Alpenverein (Austrian Alpine Club). He was also a member of the Alpine Club in London.

Published works 
With Viktor Uhlig, Rudolf Hoernes and Eduard Suess, he was co-author of the four-part Bau und bild Österreichs (1903), of which Diener wrote Part 2: Bau und bild der Ostalpen und des Karstgebietes (Construction and image of the eastern Alps and the karst areas). He also made major contributions to the paleontological bibliography, Fossilium Catalogus (1913 –). Diener's other noteworthy written efforts include:
 Libanon. Grundlinien der physischen geographie und geologie von Mittel-Syrien, 1886 – Lebanon: Outlines of physical geography and geology of central Syria. 
 Der Gebirgsbau der Westalpen, 1891 – The mountain structure of the western Alps.
 Triadische Cephalopodenfaunen der ostsibirischen Küstenprovinz, 1895 – Triassic cephalopodic fauna of the east Siberian coastal region.
 Mittheilungen über einige Cephalopodensuiten aus der Trias der Südalpen, 1901 – On some cephalopod groups from the Triassic strata of the southern Alps. 
 "Triassic faunae of Kashmir", 1913.
 Paläontologie und Abstammungslehre, 1920 – Paleontology and evolutionary theory. 
 Ammonoidea permiana, 1921 – Permian Ammonoidea.
 Cnidaria triadica, 1921 – Triassic Cnidaria.
 Lamellibranchiata triadica, 1923 – Triassic Lamellibranchiata.
 Grundzüge der Biostratigraphie, 1925 – Outline of biostratigraphy.

References 

1862 births
1928 deaths
Scientists from Vienna
University of Vienna alumni
Academic staff of the University of Vienna
19th-century Austrian geologists
Austrian geographers
Austrian paleontologists
20th-century Austrian geologists